Zhōnghuá Mínguó Línshí Zhèngfǔ may refer to:
The Provisional Government of the Republic of China (1912)
The Provisional Government of the Republic of China (1937–40), a puppet government supported by Japan